Woolah (also referred to as Doon Doon) is a medium-sized Aboriginal community, located in the Kimberley region of Western Australia, within the Shire of Wyndham-East Kimberley.

Background 
Woolah is located approximately 300 metres off the Great Northern Highway, 120 kilometres south of Kununurra. The community was established as part of Doon Doon Station in the mid-1970s. The population consists predominantly of Gija people. Population is estimated at around 80 people, in 14 houses.

Native title 
The community is located within the registered Yurriyangem Taam (WAD268/10) native title claim area.

Governance 
The community is managed through its incorporated body, Woolah Aboriginal Corporation, incorporated under the Aboriginal Councils and Associations Act 1976 on 27 October 1980.

Town planning 
Woolah Layout Plan No.1 has been prepared in accordance with State Planning Policy 3.2 Aboriginal Settlements. Layout Plan No.1 was endorsed by the community on 24 May 2000 and the Western Australian Planning Commission on 1 March 2001. The Layout Plan map-set and background report can be viewed at Planning Western Australia's website.

References

External links
 Office of the Registrar of Indigenous Corporations
 Native Title Claimant application summary

Towns in Western Australia
Aboriginal communities in Kimberley (Western Australia)